Peter Paltchik (born 4 January 1992) is a Ukrainian-born Israeli judoka, competing in the under 100 kg weight category, of which he is the current number 1 ranked Judoka in the world. In September 2019 he won the Israeli championship in the 100+ Kg category. Paltchik won the gold medal at the 2020 European Judo Championships in Prague on November 21, 2020, beating Russian judoka Arman Adamian in the final, Adding to his bronze medal from the 2018 European Judo Championships in Tel Aviv. Paltchik also won a bronze medal in the mixed team judo competition in the 2021 Olympics.

Early and personal life
Paltchik was born in 1992 in Yalta, Crimea (Ukraine). As a 9 months old baby, he immigrated to Israel with his mother Larisa and resided in the city of Rishon LeZion, Israel. About a year later, his maternal grandparents immigrated to Israel as well. By the time he was seven years old, Paltchik's mother had lived in the United States for work purposes, and Paltchik grew up in Israel with his grandparents. He attended the Yigal Alon High School, mamjoring in communication. He served as a logistic soldier at the Tzrifin base of the Israeli Air Force.

His grandfather sent him to practice Judo when he was four years old at the "Samurai Club" in Rishon LeZion under the guidance of Pavel Musin.

At the age of 16, he joined the Israeli Judo Cadet Team. At the age of 17, he won the Israel cadet championship, Junior championship, and the U23 championship that season. At the age of 18 he joined the national senior judo team under the Israel national coach Oren Samadja.

Paltchik married his Israeli girlfriend Daniel Youlzary in April 2016.

Career

2011-2014 
In September 2011, Paltchik competed in the European Championship U20 in Lumel, Belgium, and  won a silver medal in the -90 kg weight category. In June 2012, Paltchik underwent a complicated surgery in the right knee following a rupture of the posterior cruciate ligament during routine training. Because of the surgery and the rehabilitation, the shift to the senior level was interrupted until 2014.

In January 2014, Peter returned to practice as part of the senior Israeli judo team. In February 2014 he won a bronze medal in the European Open in Oberwart. In September, he again won a bronze medal at the European Open in Tallinn. He competed in the U100 kg category in the Israeli championship that year, and won the gold medal.

2015-2017 
In 2015, Paltchik decided, together with the national team coach, to raise the weight category U100 kg in order to improve his performance on the mat. In June 2015, he participated in the European Games held in Baku, and was eliminated in the second round. In November 2015, in the midst of the race to the Olympic games in Rio de Janeiro, Peter took part in the Qingdao Grand Prix in China, and ripped the ligaments in his shoulder during a fight against the Mongolian Olympic champion, Naidan. He had to undergo a long rehabilitation of 9 months.

In February 2017, he won a bronze medal at the European Cup competition in Rome. In March, he participated in the Baku Grand Slam and reached fifth place. At the 2017 European Championship held in Warsaw in April, Paltchik reached seventh place. On June, a competition was held at the European Tour in Bucharest, Romania, where Paltchik won a bronze medal. Later that month, he won a gold medal in the Cancún Grand Prix, after winning in the semifinals the Brazilian former world champion, Luciano Correra, and beating Irish Benjamin Fletcher in the waza-ari. In the 2017 World Championships held in September in Budapest, Paltchik lost in the round-of-16 to Michael Korrel from Netherlands,World Championships who was ranked first in the world. In October, Paltchik won a bronze medal at the Abu Dhabi Grand Slam, after defeating Miklós Cirjenics from Hungary.

2018-19
In April 2018, Paltchik won the gold medal in the Tbilisi Grand Prix in Georgia, when he defeated Merab Margiev of Russia in the final, after two minutes and a half. In the 2018 European Championship held in April in Tel Aviv, Paltchik won a bronze medal in the category U100 kg. In the first round, he met Latvia's Jevgenijs Borodavko. Two minutes from the start of the fight, Peter won a wazari, that eventually make him pass the first round. In the top-16, he met the Serbian Bojan Dosen, and after four minutes without scoring, the battle went into a golden score, in which the Serbian took the third penalty and Paltchik went up to the quarterfinal. At that stage, Paltchik overcame Zelym Kotsoiev from Azerbaijan, when a minute and 13 seconds to the end of the fight, he managed to get a wazari. In the semifinal, Paltchik competed against French Cyrille Maret. After 2 minutes and 16 seconds from the start of the fight, Maret entered a choking exercise, and Peter fainted. Afterwards, Paltchik competed for the bronze medal, facing the Russian Niiaz Bilalov, and won the fight after 39 seconds, after scoring an ippon.

In August 2018, Paltchik competed in the Budapest Grand Prix and won a bronze medal, after defeating Martin Pacek of Sweden with an Ippon. In October 2018, he won the gold medal in the Abu Dhabi Grand Slam, after defeating German Karl-Richard Frey in the semifinal, and the Olympic silver medalist Elmar Gasimov in the final. That time in Abu Dhabi was the first time that Israelis were allowed to wear formal Israeli judo suits, and the Israeli national anthem, 'HaTikva', was played while Paltchik was standing on the podium. In November, he won the gold medal in The Hague Grand Prix when he defeated the Belarusian Mikita Sviryd in the final after the fight entered the golden score time.

In February 2019, he won a bronze medal at the prestigious Paris Grand Slam. He reached the semifinals in which he faced Aaron Wolf from Japan. Ten seconds after the opening of the match, Paltchik scored a wazari, but lost in ippon a minute and 9 seconds before the end of the fight, after the Japanese managed to win. Paltchik went down to fight for the bronze medal, which he won by beating Croatia's Zlatko Kumeric by ippon.

On March 17, he took part in the Ekaterinburg Grand Slam, and began the second round where he met Mikhail Minchin from Armenia, and won by ippon, obtained 58 seconds from the opening and went up to the quarterfinals. In the next stage, he defeated Jevgenijs Borodavko from Latvia. In the semifinals he lost by ippon to Arman Admanin of Russia. In the fight for the bronze medal, Paltchik defeated Dutchman Michael Korrel with a wazari in the golden score, and won the medal. In July 2019 Paltchik won the bronze medal in Zagreb Grand Prix by defeating Miklós Cirjenics (Hungary).

2020-present
In January 2020 Paltchik won the gold medal in Tel Aviv Grand Prix by defeating the Brazilian Goncalves Leonardo. In February 2020 Paltchik won the gold medal in Paris Grand Slam by defeating the Georgian Varlam Liparteliani. During the 2020 European Judo Championships in November 2020, Paltchik became the European Champion, taking the Gold medal by defeating the Russian Arman Adamian in the final.

In 2021, he won one of the bronze medals in his event at the 2021 Judo World Masters held in Doha, Qatar.

Paltchik represents Israel at the 2020 Summer Olympics, competing at the men's 100 kg weight category.In his first match, Paltchik beat the 2019 Asian-Pacific champion, Mongolian Lkhagvasürengiin Otgonbaatar, to qualify for the quarter finals. There he met the 2017 world champion, Japanese Aaron Wolf, to whom he lost and turned to face Canadian two-time Pan American Champion Shady El Nahas in the repechage. Wolf went on to win the gold medal, while Paltchik , losing to El Nahas, ended the individual competition in 7th place.

He won one of the bronze medals in his event at the 2022 Judo Grand Slam Tel Aviv held in Tel Aviv, Israel.

Medals 
Source:

Israeli Championships
Partial list:
  +100 kg Category (2019)

References

External links

 
 
 
 Peter Paltchik at the European Judo Union
 A podcast with Peter Paltchik by Wharton University of Pennsylvania
 Peter Paltchik: From night security guard to European judo champion on Olympics.com

1992 births
Living people
People from Yalta
Israeli male judoka
European Games competitors for Israel
Judoka at the 2015 European Games
Ukrainian emigrants to Israel
Judoka at the 2020 Summer Olympics
Olympic judoka of Israel
Israeli people of Soviet descent
Israeli people of Ukrainian descent
Medalists at the 2020 Summer Olympics
Olympic medalists in judo
Olympic bronze medalists for Israel